Tamara Lynn Sytch (born December 7, 1972), commonly known by her ring name Sunny, is an American former professional wrestling manager, valet, ring announcer, and adult entertainer. Sytch achieved great success as Sunny within the World Wrestling Federation (WWF, later WWE) during the 1990s, including the Attitude Era, and is considered the first WWF Diva. In 1996, America Online named her the most downloaded celebrity on the internet. She later performed under her birth name in Extreme Championship Wrestling (ECW), World Championship Wrestling (WCW), and Ring of Honor. Sytch was inducted into the WWE Hall of Fame in 2011.

Early life
Sytch was born to parents of American and Russian origin. Sytch grew up in a strict family, with a father retired from the United States Navy. Sytch graduated from Cedar Ridge High School in Old Bridge Township, New Jersey in 1990. Upon entering Smoky Mountain Wrestling in 1993, her fictional "in-character" storyline presented her as having come from studying pre-law at Wellesley College in Massachusetts. She then switched to pre-med at the University of Tennessee, with the ambition to be a plastic or orthopedic surgeon.
During her first year of college, she worked as a freelance photographer.

Professional wrestling career

Smoky Mountain Wrestling (1992–1995)
Sytch started out traveling with her boyfriend Chris Candido to make some extra money. In late 1992, she signed a six-month deal with Smoky Mountain Wrestling. She first appeared onscreen as Tammy Fytch in 1993. She played a villain, who idolized Hillary Clinton. In her first storyline with the company, she threatened to file a sexual discrimination lawsuit due to the lack of prominent positions offered to females. In June 1993, an unnamed Sytch made a cameo appearance at Eastern Championship Wrestling's Super Summer Sizzler Spectacular event.

Sytch managed Brian Lee to the Heavyweight Championship and also began accompanying Candido in his matches. By May 1994, she was managing the two men as a tag team, which won the Tag Team Championship from The Rock 'n' Roll Express. Both Sytch and Candido, however, left the promotion in early 1995 for jobs with the World Wrestling Federation (WWF).

World Wrestling Federation (1995–1998)
In late 1994, Sytch was contacted by the WWF, and she began appearing as Tamara Murphy, a commentator for "Live Event News" segments during syndicated WWF television shows. One month later, Candido joined the WWF, and the duo began appearing as Sunny and Skip, known collectively as The Bodydonnas, villainous fitness fanatics. Zip (portrayed by Tom Prichard) later joined the team, and Sunny was in their corner when they won the Tag Team Championship over The Godwinns at WrestleMania XII. In 1996, she won Pro Wrestling Illustrateds Manager of the Year Award. Weeks later, The Godwinns regained the championship, and Sunny turned on The Bodydonnas in favor of the new champions. She then turned on The Godwinns and helped The Smoking Gunns win the Tag Team Championship. After The Smokin' Gunns lost the title at In Your House 10: Mind Games, she fired them in the middle of the ring.

She spent a short time as the manager of Faarooq Asaad, aiding him in his feud over the Intercontinental Championship with Marc Mero and his valet Sable. Sytch then began acting as host for several WWF television shows, including LiveWire and Shotgun Saturday Night. In addition, she appeared on MTV's Singled Out and Entertainment Tonight. Meanwhile, Candido left the WWF for Extreme Championship Wrestling (ECW), and it was not long before she began making guest appearances with him in the promotion. In August 1997, she appeared at ECW's Hardcore Heaven 1997 pay-per-view.

In 1998, Sunny became a face and briefly became the manager for the Legion of Doom 2000, leading them to a win in a Tag Team Championship number one contender battle royal at WrestleMania XIV. Sunny would continue to manage them until she was released in July 1998 amid rumors of backstage problems with Rena "Sable" Mero and an addiction to painkillers, as well as no-showing several appearances.

Extreme Championship Wrestling (1998–1999)
After being released by the WWF in July 1998, Sytch joined Extreme Championship Wrestling (ECW). She made her debut at Heat Wave four days after her WWF release. Now billed as Tammy Lynn Sytch, she assisted Candido in his win over Lance Storm and their subsequent feud. By September, Storm introduced his own valet, a parody of Sytch, "Tammy Lynn Bytch" (later known as Dawn Marie). Later that year, amid more rumors of drug use, Sytch and Candido took some time off of television.

When the duo returned, Candido re-aligned with Shane Douglas' Triple Threat, and Sytch began a feud with Douglas' manager Francine. The feud was cut short when Sytch was arrested after violating a restraining order filed by her mother. After a brief tour of Australia, she returned in October 1999 on an episode of ECW on TNN, where she talked openly about her past drug issues and reformation. Candido and Sytch left the promotion in December 1999.

World Championship Wrestling (2000)
After appearing in Xtreme Pro Wrestling (XPW) in early 2000, both Sytch and Candido signed on with World Championship Wrestling (WCW). Candido debuted in March of that year and Sytch debuted one month later at Spring Stampede, helping him win the WCW Cruiserweight Championship in a match against The Artist Formerly Known as Prince Iaukea. She then feuded with Iaukea's valet Paisley. The short-lived feud came to a conclusion at Slamboree, when The Artist and Paisley stripped Sytch 's dress off to reveal her undergarments after Candido defeated The Artist in a singles match. Sytch and Candido then briefly feuded with Crowbar and Daffney. Candido later dropped the title, which marked the end of the couple's run with the company. As in the past, Sytch's departure was surrounded by rumors of drug abuse.

Independent circuit (2000–2018)
After being released from WCW, the duo landed in Xtreme Pro Wrestling where she managed Candido to a title (the XPW World Heavyweight Title) once again. Candido and Sytch parted ways with XPW and started touring other independent wrestling promotions. In the spring of 2003, Sytch and Candido moved to Puerto Rico and were set to work for Victor Quinones' International Wrestling Association promotion. Sabu convinced them to work for Carlos Colón's rival World Wrestling Council (WWC) promotion instead. After six months, the couple quit the promotion and headed back to the States. Upon their return to the States, both Sytch and Candido briefly lived with former ECW wrestler Hack Myers in his home in Florida.

After the death of Candido, Sytch became regularly involved in the independent circuit again. Sytch made appearances as a referee for NWS Wrestling in May 2005 and attended a Chris Candido Memorial show on June 4, 2005. Also, Sytch was a part of Hardcore Homecoming on June 10, 2005. She first came out with Johnny Grunge and Pitbull #1 to do a tribute to former ECW wrestlers who had recently died. Among those honored were Candido, Pitbull #2, and Rocco Rock. They were interrupted by Danny Doring and Roadkill, but 911 cleared them out of the ring.

During this time period, Sytch appeared at the New Jersey-based NWA Cyberspace promotion. Soon after Sytch's departure from NWA Cyberspace, the New Jersey-based National Wrestling Superstars (NWS) became her new primary wrestling promotion. She appeared on a handful the promotion's shows in the summer, and on June 3, 2006, she managed Lex Luger to victory over Johnny Candido. Prior to the bout, a presentation was held from The Manasquan Elks Lodge to the Chris Candido Memorial Fund. The Elks Lodge donated $500 to the fund, with the money being used towards a scholarship for a Manasquan High School student. Sytch returned to NWA Shockwave (formerly NWA Cyberspace) in 2006 as a featured headliner. On December 1, 2006, Sytch was appointed the new commissioner of NWA Shockwave. Immediately following this announcement, Sytch declared all Shockwave championship titles vacant and informed fans that new Heavyweight and Internet Champions would be crowned on January 13.

On December 22, 2007, Sytch won her first championship, the WSU Championship, after defeating the champion Alicia at a Women Superstars Uncensored (WSU) show in Lake Hiawatha, New Jersey, holding the title until March 21, 2008, when she lost the title to Nikki Roxx in a three-way match that also included Alexa Thatcher. Sytch turned heel at WSU's J-Cup Tournament a day later, when she appeared as the villainous manager for Dawn Marie in her first round match against Becky Bayless, which Bayless won via disqualification.

Sytch made an appearance at a Ring of Honor show on December 29, 2007 held at New York City, seated at ringside during a non-title three-way match where Daizee Haze defeated fellow ROH regulars Lacey, and then-Shimmer Champion Sara Del Rey. Upon the conclusion of the match, Lacey verbally assaulted Sytch and accused her of denigrating women's roles in professional wrestling, which supposedly resulted in women's wrestlers not being taken seriously in the industry. She also threatened to assault Sytch, but Haze made the save on Sytch's behalf. Sytch made a few more appearances for ROH in 2008, where she repeatedly offered her services to Austin Aries but was turned down. On the April 12 ROH show, Larry Sweeney announced that he had opened a "Diva School" and invited Sytch to be the trainer, an offer she said she would consider.

Sytch made an appearance at Dynamite Championship Wrestling's 9 Year Anniversary Event in February 2012. She would be the official Host of the Event. She also made an appearance for Pennsylvania Premiere Wrestling on September 14, 2013 at the "Back at It" event in Freeland, Pennsylvania.

A week after being released from jail in October 2018, Sytch announced via Facebook that she would be taking bookings for what she claimed would be her final nine to twelve months of appearances before retiring to a private life.

WWE appearances (2007, 2009, 2011)

Sytch made an appearance on the 15th Anniversary of Raw. Sytch, as Sunny, participated at WrestleMania XXV on April 5, 2009 in the 25-Diva battle royal for the crown of "Miss WrestleMania", but was eliminated by Beth Phoenix. Sytch was inducted into the WWE Hall of Fame by the entire roster of WWE Divas on April 2, 2011. In 2021, WWE Network listed her as one of the many female performers who made an impact in WWE outside the ring.

Adult entertainment
Sytch has claimed that, in 1997, Playboy had approached her and offered a six-figure sum to pose nude for the magazine. Sytch stated that she declined the offer because she didn't feel that she was emotionally ready to do something like that. Rena "Sable" Mero, with whom Sytch had real-life animosity, later disputed Sytch's claim that she was approached for a possible photo shoot. From 2001 to 2003, however, Sytch regularly posed nude for Missy Hyatt's adult website Wrestling Vixxxens. In later years, Sytch said she regretted taking part in the website due to money she claimed she never received as well as the sexual actions some of the other models performed in their own photo and video shoots.

In 2016, Vivid Entertainment released a pornographic film featuring Sytch titled Sunny Side Up: In Through the Backdoor.

After being released from prison in 2020, Sytch created an OnlyFans account to upload adult-oriented content.

Personal life
Sytch attended the same high school as her long-time boyfriend, Chris Candido, who would later introduce her to the professional wrestling industry. Sytch regularly managed Candido throughout his career  until his death in 2005. By 2007, she was once again in school, studying Medical Technology.

Sytch claims to have had a nine month relationship with Shawn Michaels in the late 1990s.

Sytch was friends with Bret Hart and would entertain his children whenever they followed him on tour. Sytch walked out of Raw the night after, in reaction to the Montreal Screwjob, the incident in which WWF owner Vince McMahon legitimately double-crossed Hart, who was leaving for main competitor WCW, and cost Hart the WWF Championship.

Sytch was rushed to the hospital in 2001 after her appendix burst, which required time off from wrestling to heal.  While in jail in 2013, Sytch said that she was diagnosed with cervical cancer but underwent a hysterectomy and was later diagnosed as cancer free.

She released an autobiography, A Star Shattered: The Rise & Fall & Rise of Wrestling Diva Tammy "Sunny" Sytch, on February 4, 2016.

Legal issues

In 2012, Sytch was arrested five times in a four-week span, for disorderly conduct, third-degree burglary, and three counts of violating a protective order. She was arrested a sixth time in January 2013, also for violating a protective order. Sytch served 114 days in a Connecticut jail and was released in May 2013.

Throughout May and June 2015, Sytch was arrested in Pennsylvania three times for driving under the influence (DUI). Sytch pled guilty to all three  charges in January 2016. A judge sentenced her to 90 days in jail on August 18, but counted her 97 days in rehab as time served. However, she was charged with violating her parole that September and remained in jail until February 3, 2017. 

While on probation, Sytch was arrested in New Jersey for two DUIs on January 23 and February 2, 2018, and was also charged with fleeing the scene of an accident in relation to the February 2 arrest. After failing to appear in court for either case, she was arrested on February 27, 2018 for two fugitive from justice charges and six counts of contempt of court and was placed in the Monmouth County Correctional Institution. While she was being processed it was discovered that she was a fugitive from justice due to her parole in Pennsylvania having been revoked in August 2017. Sytch was subsequently extradited to Pennsylvania on March 23 and remained at the Carbon County Correctional Facility in Nesquehoning until she was paroled on October 9, 2018.

A bench warrant was issued for Sytch in Pennsylvania on February 15, 2019, and the Carbon County Probation Department filed a motion to revoke Sytch's October 2018 parole. She was arrested in Seaside Heights, New Jersey later that month for DUI and other driving offenses and subsequently released into the custody of the Holmdel Police Department after it was discovered that she had outstanding warrants in both Holmdel Township and Knowlton Township, New Jersey. She was charged with contempt of court on both warrants. On March 20, Sytch was extradited from Monmouth County back to Carbon County Correctional Facility to address her Pennsylvania charges. After over a year in prison, Sytch was released on February 25, 2020.

Sytch was arrested on July 13, 2020, for allegedly eluding a police officer, contempt/violation of a domestic violence restraining order, and operating a motor vehicle during a second license suspension. She was held at the Monmouth County Correctional Institution, and was released on June 9, 2021, due to a court order.

Sytch was once again arrested on January 13, 2022, in Keansburg, New Jersey for unlawfully possessing a weapon and making terroristic threats. She was booked into the Monmouth County Correctional Institution, but released the following day after being ordered to check-in weekly with the court. The charges stem from an incident in which she allegedly threatened to murder an "intimate partner" with a pair of scissors. If convicted, Sytch faces eleven years in prison. She was arrested again a month later in Keansburg and charged with eleven driving offences, including DUI.

Sytch was involved in a fatal car crash in Volusia County, Florida, that killed a 75-year-old man on March 25, 2022. According to a police report from the Ormond Beach Police Department, Sytch was driving a 2012 Mercedes-Benz when she crashed into the rear of a 2013 Kia Sorento that had been stopped at a stoplight. Witnesses told police that Sytch was driving at a high speed when she crashed into the Kia Sorento. Sytch was transported to the hospital with unknown injuries and a sample of her blood was taken for analysis. In May 2022, Sytch was arrested on DUI and manslaughter-related charges after toxicology reports found that her blood alcohol content was about 3.5 times the legal limit during the fatal car crash. After initially being released after posting $227,500 bond, a judge deemed her to be a danger to the community and revoked her bond six days later, and Sytch was returned to jail while she awaits trial. She faces 26 years in prison if convicted.

Legacy
Sytch became known as the "first Diva in WWE history" after her run in the 1990s. During this time, her 1996 bikini issue of Raw Magazine made a record number of sales. Her popularity expanded beyond professional wrestling, as America Online deemed her the most downloaded woman that same year. According to Slam! Wrestling, Sytch's pairings with the Smokin' Gunns and the Godwins made her a "loathed villain, but one of the hottest personalities in WWE." WWE describe her as "the person who redefined the role of women in WWE", adding: "She wasn’t just a brainless bikini model or a vivacious valet at ringside. She was a pinup, a fast-talking manager and could throw down when she needed to. In short, she was sexy, smart and powerful." For her contributions to the promotion, she was inducted into the WWE Hall of Fame in 2011.

The Post and Courier columnist Mike Mooneyham described Sytch as having "captivated audiences during her time in the business", but that "substance abuse and backstage drama, and later legal and personal problems, have plagued her over the years." After her 2022 arrest on DUI and manslaughter-related charges, former WWE wrestler Bill DeMott, whose daughter was killed by a drunk driver, called on the promotion to remove her from their Hall of Fame. The call was backed by WWE Hall of Famer Mark Henry. Other WWE Hall of Famer Booker T though has objected to this and has claimed that she should not be removed as it wouldn't actually achieve anything.

Championships and accomplishmentsCauliflower Alley ClubOther honoree (1996)New England Pro Wrestling Hall of FameClass of 2013Pro Wrestling IllustratedPWI Manager of the Year (1996)Women Superstars UncensoredWSU Championship (1 time)World Wrestling Federation/WWE'
 Slammy Award (2 times)
 Best Buns (1996)
 "Minds Behind the Mayhem" for Manager of the Year (1996)
WWE Hall of Fame (Class of 2011)

References

Further reading

External links

1972 births
21st-century American women
21st-century American criminals
American color commentators
American female adult models
American female criminals
American female professional wrestlers
American people convicted of burglary
American pornographic film actresses
American prisoners and detainees
Living people
OnlyFans creators
People extradited within the United States
People from Matawan, New Jersey
Pornographic film actors from New Jersey
Professional wrestlers from New Jersey
Professional wrestling announcers
Professional wrestling managers and valets
Prisoners and detainees of Connecticut
Prisoners and detainees of New Jersey
Prisoners and detainees of Pennsylvania
The Road Warriors members
WWE Hall of Fame inductees